Pon Sivapalan (1952 – 11 September 1998)  was a Sri Lankan politician.

Sivapalan succeeded Sarojini Yogeswaran as mayor of Jaffna after she was assassinated in 1998 by the LTTE. Like Yogeswaran, Sivapalan belonged to the Tamil United Liberation Front.  He too was assassinated, on 11 September 1998, when a mine exploded in the Jaffna city council chambers with Sri Lanka Army Jaffna town commander, Brigadier Susantha Mendis and his Principal Staff Officer (PSO), Captain Ramanayaka and Senior Superintendent of Police in charge of Jaffna Division, Chandra Perera. Later it was identified as a Claymore bomb attack and the LTTE was believed to be responsible. Following Sivapalan's death, the Jaffna mayoral office had been officially dissolved and has remained under the purview of the Government Agent of the Jaffna district.

References

External links
 Human Rights Watch report
 TamilNet coverage

1952 births
1998 deaths
Sri Lankan Tamil politicians
Assassinated mayors
Assassinated Sri Lankan politicians
Mayors of Jaffna